Ulvik is a municipality in Vestland county, Norway. The administrative centre of the municipality is the village of Ulvik. The villages of Osa and Finse are also located in Ulvik municipality.

The  municipality is the 158th largest by area out of the 356 municipalities in Norway. Ulvik is the 331st most populous municipality in Norway with a population of 1,051. Of the municipality's total population, nearly half live in the village of Ulvik at the end of the Ulvikafjorden. The vast majority of those who do not live in the village of Ulvik live on the farms surrounding the village or at the end of the Osa Fjord in the village of Osa.

In 2016, the chief of police for Vestlandet formally suggested a reconfiguration of police districts and stations. He proposed that the police station in Ulvik be closed.

General information

The parish of Graven (later spelled "Granvin") was established as a municipality on 1 January 1838 (see formannskapsdistrikt law). This large municipality/parish included two annexes: Ulvik and Eidfjord. On 1 January 1859, Ulvik became the main parish, making Graven and Eidfjord annexes to Ulvik, and the name of the large municipality was changed from Graven to Ulvik.

On 1 May 1891, the western annex of Graven (population: 1,331) and the southeastern annex of Eidfjord (population: 1,018) were separated from Ulvik to become separate municipalities. This left Ulvik with a much smaller size and 1,410 residents. In 1895, a small area of Eidfjord (population: 3) was transferred to Ulvik.

Name
The municipality (originally the parish) is named after the old "Ulvik" farm, since the first Ulvik Church was built there. The first element is ulfr means "wolf", the last element is vík which means "cove" or "wick".

Coat of arms
The coat of arms was granted on 19 December 1986. They are red with a yellow figure shown in the center of the arms. The figure is a traditional design seen in the local folk-art and in local textiles. The pattern can be traced in local arts as far back as the 16th century, and is similar to the selburose. This figure is also used in the bunad of Ulvik.

Churches
The Church of Norway has one parish within the municipality of Ulvik. It is part of the Hardanger og Voss prosti (deanery) in the Diocese of Bjørgvin.

Geography
The municipality is situated around the Hardangerfjord's northeastern arms: the Osa Fjord and Ulvikafjorden, extending far into the Hardangervidda plateau. The northernmost part of the Hardangerjøkulen glacier is in Ulvik. The Finse and Hallingskeid areas lie just south of the Hallingskarvet National Park which partially sits inside Ulvik and includes the Hallingskarvet mountains. The municipality of Ulvik borders the municipalities of Eidfjord, Ullensvang, Voss, Aurland, and Hol. Lakes in the region include Finsevatnet and Flakavatnet. The headwaters of the Flåmselvi river also lie in Ulvik.

History
{{Historical populations
|footnote = Source: Statistics Norway.
|shading = off
|1951|1548
|1960|1488
|1970|1351
|1980|1362
|1990|1239
|2000|1222
|2010|1129
|2019|1093
}}
After the dissolution of the union between Norway and Sweden 1905, Ulvik was one of the few municipalities that returned a majority in favour of a republic rather than a monarchy in the national referendum on the issue.

The village of Ulvik was nearly totally destroyed on 25 April 1940, during the German invasion of Norway, when fighting erupted between a German landing party arriving in boats, and a Norwegian force on land. Most of the village was burned down, and three civilians were killed. An unknown number of German soldiers were also killed in the fighting.

Government
All municipalities in Norway, including Ulvik, are responsible for primary education (through 10th grade), outpatient health services, senior citizen services, unemployment and other social services, zoning, economic development, and municipal roads. The municipality is governed by a municipal council of elected representatives, which in turn elect a mayor.  The municipality falls under the Hordaland District Court and the Gulating Court of Appeal.

Municipal council
The municipal council  of Ulvik is made up of 17 representatives that are elected to four year terms. The party breakdown of the council is as follows:

Mayor
The mayors of Ulvik (incomplete list):
2011–present: Hans Petter Thorbjørnsen (Ap)
2007-2011: Mona Haugland Hellesnes (V)
1995-2001: Terje Breivik (V)
1987-1991: Lars Sponheim (V)

Transportation

It takes around two hours to drive from the city of Bergen to Ulvik via the European route E16 highway to Vossevangen and then taking Norwegian National Road 13 through the Vallavik Tunnel to Ulvik. The Norwegian National Road 13 continues through Ulvik before crossing the Hardanger Bridge which goes over the Hardangerfjord. The nearest airport is Bergen Flesland Airport in Bergen.

The Bergen Line runs through the northern part of Ulvik. It runs through a region that has no road access, but is a popular with hiking and sports enthusiasts. The Finse Tunnel just outside Finse is one of the longest railway tunnels in Norway. The Rallarvegen "road" is an historic road that follows the Bergen Line through Ulvik. It is a popular biking and hiking route. Ulvik is also visited in the summer by numerous foreign cruise ships who travel along the fjord.

Famous residents

 Catharine Hermine Kølle (1788–1859) Norwegian adventurer, writer and artist; lived in Ulvik from 1807
 Lars Osa (1860 in Ulvik – 1958) artist, worked on church restorations and noted fiddle player
 Olav H. Hauge (1908 in Ulvik – 1994) a Norwegian horticulturist, translator and poet
 Sigbjørn Bernhoft Osa (1910 in Ulvik – 1990) a Norwegian fiddler and traditional folk musician
 Gunnar Hjeltnes (1922 in Ulvik – 2013) an alpine skier, competed at the 1952 Winter Olympics 
 Lars Sponheim (born 1957) a politician, County Governor of Vestland; Mayor of Ulvik 1988-1991
 Terje Breivik (born 1965) a Norwegian politician and entrepreneur; Mayor of Ulvik 1995-2001

References

External links

Municipal fact sheet from Statistics Norway 
Municipality website 
Ulvik Tourist Office (available in English/German/Norwegian)''

 
Municipalities of Vestland
1838 establishments in Norway